Henry Walter "Slick" Schlichter (March 1, 1866 – January 15, 1944) was an American sports executive, sportswriter, and boxing referee.

Career
Born in Philadelphia, Pennsylvania, Schlichter wrote for the Philadelphia Item, a daily newspaper. Along with National Baseball Hall of Famer Sol White and Philadelphia Tribune baseball writer Harry A. Smith, Schlichter co-founded the Philadelphia Giants Negro league baseball team. He owned the Giants until he disbanded the team in 1911. He also co-founded an early all-black baseball league, the National Association of Colored Baseball Clubs of the United States and Cuba, and served as its president from 1906 to 1909.

Schlichter worked as a boxing referee from 1893 to 1910. He appears as the referee in Thomas Eakins' 1898 painting Taking the Count.

References

External links

Referee information

1866 births
1944 deaths
Writers from Philadelphia
Sportswriters from Pennsylvania
Negro league baseball executives
American boxing referees